Zoppi is a surname. Notable people with the surname include:

Antonio Zoppi (1860–1926), Italian painter
Irene M. Zoppi (born 1966), United States Army Reserve officer
Jimmy Zoppi (born 1954), American voice actor, voice director, pianist, and vocalist

Italian-language surnames